Samuel Bennion may refer to:

 Sam Bennion (1871–1941), English footballer and later chairman of Port Vale
 Samuel O. Bennion (1874–1946), member of the First Council of the Seventy of The Church of Jesus Christ of Latter-day Saints